The yellow-ringed white-eye (Heleia wallacei) is a species of bird in the family Zosteropidae. It is found in the Lesser Sunda Islands.

Its natural habitat is subtropical or tropical moist lowland forest.

References

yellow-ringed white-eye
Birds of the Lesser Sunda Islands
Flores Island (Indonesia)
yellow-ringed white-eye
Taxonomy articles created by Polbot